Edvin Fältström (30 December 1890 – 26 July 1965) was a Swedish wrestler. He competed at the 1912 and the 1920 Summer Olympics.

References

External links
 

1890 births
1965 deaths
Olympic wrestlers of Sweden
Wrestlers at the 1912 Summer Olympics
Wrestlers at the 1920 Summer Olympics
Swedish male sport wrestlers
People from Landskrona Municipality
Sportspeople from Skåne County
20th-century Swedish people